Jeff Fonda is the Founder and CEO of The Literate Earth Project, which as of 2017 had opened 15 libraries in Uganda. In 2016 he was named to International Literacy Association's 2016 '30-under-30' list. He was also named to the State University of New York at New Paltz alumni '40-under-40' list.

Jeff graduated from SUNY New Paltz with a degree in International Relations in 2010, where was also elected student body vice president.  He is currently a Global Masters of Business Administration student at Temple University's Fox School of Business with expected graduation in May 2018.

References

Year of birth missing (living people)
Living people